Sioux County is a county located along the southern border of the U.S. state of North Dakota. As of the 2020 census, the population was 3,898. Its eastern border is the Missouri River and its county seat is Fort Yates.

History
The county was created by proclamation of Governor Louis B. Hanna on September 3, 1914. It was named for the Native American Lakota, whose historic territory included this area. The county government organization was completed on September 12 of that year. The county lies entirely within the Standing Rock Indian Reservation, forming the northernmost 30 percent of the reservation; the balance of the reservation is in South Dakota. It is the only county in North Dakota that is entirely within an Indian reservation. From 2013 to 2018, Sioux County was included in the Bismarck, ND Metropolitan Statistical Area.

Geography
Sioux County lies on the south line of North Dakota. Its south boundary line abuts the north boundary line of the state of South Dakota. Its north boundary line is formed by the east-northeastward-flowing Cedar Creek, which discharges into the Missouri River at the county's northeast corner, and its east boundary line is formed by the south-southeast-flowing Missouri River, which also forms Lake Oahe along the county boundary line. Porcupine Creek flows southeastward into the Missouri River, draining the northeastern part of the county. The county terrain consists of low rolling hills etched with gullies and drainages; the area is mostly devoted to agriculture. The terrain slopes to the east and south; its highest point is on the west line, near the southwestern corner of the county, at 2,602' (793m) ASL.

The southwest corner counties of North Dakota (Adams, Billings, Bowman, Golden Valley, Grant, Hettinger, Slope, and Stark) observe Mountain Time. The counties of McKenzie, Dunn, and Sioux are split, observing Mountain Time in their western portions.

Major highways

  North Dakota Highway 6
  North Dakota Highway 24
  North Dakota Highway 31
  North Dakota Highway 49
  North Dakota Highway 1806

Adjacent counties

 Morton County - north (observes Central Time)
 Emmons County - east (observes Central Time)
 Corson County, South Dakota - south (observes Mountain Time)
 Adams County - west (observes Mountain Time)
 Grant County - northwest (observes Mountain Time)

Protected areas
 Cedar River National Grassland (part)
 Froelich Dam State Game Management Area

Demographics

2000 census
As of the 2000 census, there were 4,044 people, 1,095 households, and 871 families in the county. The population density was 3.70/sqmi (1.42/km2). There were 1,216 housing units at an average density of 1.11/sqmi (0.43/km2). The racial makeup of the county was 84.59% Native American, 14.34% White, 0.02% Black or African American, 0.02% Asian, 0.05% Pacific Islander, 0.07% from other races, and 0.89% from two or more races. 1.61% of the population were Hispanic or Latino of any race. 11.5% were of German ancestry.

There were 1,095 households, out of which 48.90% had children under the age of 18 living with them, 39.10% were married couples living together, 29.10% had a female householder with no husband present, and 20.40% were non-families. 16.60% of all households were made up of individuals, and 4.40% had someone living alone who was 65 years of age or older. The average household size was 3.63 and the average family size was 3.98.

The county population contained 40.30% under the age of 18, 11.10% from 18 to 24, 26.90% from 25 to 44, 16.20% from 45 to 64, and 5.60% who were 65 years of age or older. The median age was 24 years. For every 100 females there were 104.20 males. For every 100 females age 18 and over, there were 99.70 males.

The median income for a household in the county was $22,483, and the median income for a family was $24,000. Males had a median income of $22,039 versus $19,458 for females. The per capita income for the county was $7,731.  About 33.60% of families and 39.20% of the population were below the poverty line, including 44.40% of those under age 18 and 25.80% of those age 65 or over. The county's per-capita income makes it one of the poorest counties in the United States.

2010 census
As of the 2010 census, there were 4,153 people, 1,158 households, and 900 families in the county. The racial makeup of the county was 84.1% American Indian, 12.6% white, 0.2% black or African American, 0.1% Asian, 0.1% from other races, and 2.9% from two or more races. Those of Hispanic or Latino origin made up 2.0% of the population. In terms of ancestry, 13.5% were German, and 0.3% were American.

Of the 1,158 households, 54.1% had children under the age of 18 living with them, 32.5% were married couples living together, 31.6% had a female householder with no husband present, 22.3% were non-families, and 17.4% of all households were made up of individuals. The average household size was 3.55 and the average family size was 3.89. The median age was 26.3 years.

The median income for a household in the county was $30,990 and the median income for a family was $31,098. Males had a median income of $31,894 versus $26,619 for females. The per capita income for the county was $13,542. About 39.0% of families and 47.2% of the population were below the poverty line, including 58.4% of those under age 18 and 36.1% of those age 65 or over.

Communities

Cities
 Fort Yates (county seat)
 Selfridge
 Solen

Census-designated places
 Cannon Ball
 Porcupine

Township
 Menz

Politics
With its population being mostly Native American, Sioux County is one of the most consistently Democratic counties in North Dakota, having last backed a Republican presidential candidate in 1980. Since then the closest a Republican has gotten to winning the county was Ronald Reagan in 1984 who lost the county by 19 percent. John Hoeven, in his 2010 election to the Senate, as well as his 2008 reelection as governor, won the county. In 2016, Hillary Clinton won the most votes in Sioux County, one of only two counties she won in the state. Green Party candidate Jill Stein received 10.4% of the popular vote.

Education
School districts include:
 Fort Yates Public School District 4 (in cooperation with the Standing Rock Bureau of Indian Education (BIE) grant school)
 Selfridge Public School District 8
 Solen Public School District 3

See also
 National Register of Historic Places listings in Sioux County, North Dakota

References

External links 
 Sioux County maps, Sheet 1 (eastern) and Sheet 2 (western), North Dakota DOT

 
North Dakota counties on the Missouri River
North Dakota placenames of Native American origin
1914 establishments in North Dakota
Populated places established in 1914
Counties in multiple time zones